Pavel Molchanov (1902–1977) was a Soviet and Russian film and theater actor. He was awarded the People's Artist of the USSR in 1948.

He is known for playing Vladimir Lenin in film The Unforgettable Year 1919 (1951).

Selected filmography 
 1951 – The Unforgettable Year 1919 as Vladimir Lenin
 1953 - The Skylarks are Singing
 1954 - Children of the Partisan
 1954 - Who Laughs Last

References

External links 
 
 

1902 births
1977 deaths
Soviet actors
People's Artists of the USSR
People's Artists of the Byelorussian Soviet Socialist Republic
Recipients of the Order of the Red Banner of Labour